Claudio Calasans (born in São Paulo, Brazil) is a Brazilian Jiu Jitsu (BJJ) world champion and ADCC Absolute champion.

References

External links
 http://www.bjjheroes.com/bjj-fighters/claudio-calasans-facts-and-bio

Brazilian practitioners of Brazilian jiu-jitsu
Living people
1989 births
People awarded a black belt in Brazilian jiu-jitsu
Sportspeople from São Paulo